Omkareshwar Road railway station is a small railway station in Khandwa district, Madhya Pradesh. Its code is OM. It serves Omkareshwar town. The station consists of two platforms. The platforms are not well sheltered. It lacks many facilities including water and sanitation. The station is situated on the  Akola–Ratlam rail line, which is the under gauge conversion. Once finished will provide vital connectivity between Indore with rest of Northern India.

Major trains

Some of the important trains that runs from Omkareshwar are:

 52963/52964 Mhow–Sanawad Passenger
 52975/52976 Mhow–Sanawad Passenger
 52973/52974 Mhow–Sanawad Passenger
 52973/52974 Mhow–Sanawad Passenger

Connectivity
The station is connected with Dr. Ambedkar Nagar Railway Station (MHOW) to the north west and Sanawad to the south-east on the Dr. Ambedkar Nagar (MHOW) - Sanawad Meter Gauge Railline.

The station is well-connected to Indore Jn. via Dr. Ambedkar Nagar, MHOW.

Electrification
At present, the station is on non-electrified rail route.

Developments
The conversion of Dr. Ambedkar Nagar Railway Station (MHOW) to Sanawad (meter-gauge) to (broad-gauge) rail line is in progress. Upon completion, It would directly connect Indore to Mumbai.

References

Railway stations in Khandwa district
Ratlam railway division